Il Volo... Takes Flight: Live from the Detroit Opera House is the first live album by Italian operatic pop trio Il Volo. The album was recorded during one their first North American shows. It includes eight tracks from their debut album, Il Volo.

The album went gold in Mexico  and has sold more than 46,000 copies in USA

Reviews
Jon O'Brien of AllMusic gave the album 3.5 out of 5 saying, “[The album] showcase their impressively mature and warm romantic tones in front of a lush 66-piece orchestra and a receptive sellout crowd” He added it’s “a far more authentic proposition on record than their older counterparts, Il Divo”

Track listing

Charts

Weekly charts

Year-end charts

Credits
 Arranged By: William Ross, Kenny O'Brien, Steven Mercurio 
 Art Direction, Design: Liam Ward
 Bass: Reggie Hamilton
 Conductor [Orchestra]: Steven Mercurio
 Coordinator: Joann Tominaga
 Drums: Blair Sinta
 Engineer: Kenny O’Brien, Favio Esquivel
 Guitar: Dean Parks
 Mixed By: Cristian Robles
 Photography By: Glenn Corcoran
 Piano, Keyboards: Randy Kerber

References

2012 live albums
Geffen Records live albums
Il Volo albums
Italian-American culture in Michigan